Erik Hahn (born 25 September 1970) is a German wrestler. He competed in the men's Greco-Roman 74 kg at the 1996 Summer Olympics.

References

External links
 

1970 births
Living people
German male sport wrestlers
Olympic wrestlers of Germany
Wrestlers at the 1996 Summer Olympics
Sportspeople from Potsdam